Cheer refers to the act of cheering.

Cheer may also refer to:

Cheer (brand), laundry detergent brand
Cheer (cheese), cheese brand
Cheer (TV series), American docuseries
Cheer Chen (born 1975), singer-songwriter
Jacqui Cheer, British police officer
Margaret Cheer, American actress
Ursula Cheer, New Zealand academic

See also
Cheers (disambiguation)
Cheerleading, also referred to as cheer